Ozyptila danubiana is a species of crab spiders found in Romania and Greece.

References

External links 

danubiana
Spiders of Europe
Spiders described in 1998